Charles Kilpatrick (1872 – 28 May 1935) was a trade union president and member the Queensland Legislative Council.

Early life 
Kilpatrick was born at Pollokshaws, Glasgow, Scotland, to John Kilpatrick his wife Annie (née McKenzie). He spent his entire working life involved in mining, both as a miner, and then in the trade union representing them.

Political career
When the Labour Party starting forming governments in Queensland, it found much of its legislation being blocked by a hostile Council, where members had been appointed for life by successive conservative governments. After a failed referendum in May 1917, Premier Ryan tried a new tactic, and later that year advised the Governor, Sir Hamilton John Goold-Adams, to appoint thirteen new members whose allegiance lay with Labour to the Council.

In 1920, the new Premier Ted Theodore appointed a further fourteen new members to the Council with Kilpatrick amongst the appointees. He served for two years until the Council was abolished in March 1922.

Personal life
Kilpatrick married Marion Rodger at Larkhall, South Lanarkshire and together had nine children.

He died in Ipswich, Queensland in May 1935 and was buried at Ipswich General Cemetery.

References

Members of the Queensland Legislative Council
1872 births
1935 deaths
Australian Labor Party members of the Parliament of Queensland
Burials at Ipswich General Cemetery
Politicians from Glasgow